The 1924 Louisville Cardinals football team was an American football team that represented the University of Louisville as an independent during the 1924 college football season. In their second and final season under head coach Fred Enke, the Cardinals compiled a 3–5–1 record.

Schedule

References

Louisville
Louisville Cardinals football seasons
Louisville Cardinals football